The term Trade Mart can be a generic English reference to any sizable commercial establishment. Well known individual Trade Marts include:

 International Trade Mart
 Dallas Trade Mart
Brussels Trade Mart
Trade Mart of North Carolina (acquired by WilcoHess in 2005)

Retail markets